Ed Badger (born November 5, 1932) is a former college and professional basketball coach.

Early life
Badger played junior varsity college basketball at the University of Iowa, and later for the U.S. Air Force and division teams.  He got his first basketball coaching job at St. Mary's High School, while getting his master's degree from the University of Iowa.  After receiving his master's degree, Badger moved to Marengo, Iowa to coach the Marengo High School basketball team. He won the conference in his second year.

Coaching career

Early jobs
Badger then moved up to the college coaching ranks. For the next 15 years he was a very successful head basketball coach at Wilbur Wright College. Badger's teams won 25 or more games ever year he coached. In the 1973–74 and 1974–75 seasons Badger's teams went 33–0 and were ranked number 1 nationally in the polls for junior college teams.

In international basketball, Badger was an Olympic basketball camp coach from 1968 to 1974. He also coached the Austrian national team in 1972 and coached the 1973 U.S. team during the World University Games in Moscow, winning the gold medal.

Chicago Bulls
Badger joined the Chicago Bulls as a part‐time assistant and head scout in 1973 while still athletic director and coach at Wright. He became a full-time assistant in 1975–76. He was appointed the Bulls' third-ever head coach on August 25, 1976, succeeding Dick Motta who had accepted a similar position with the Washington Bullets three months earlier on May 28. He served in that capacity for two seasons from 1976 to 1978. He had a winning record and made the playoffs in his first season.

Cincinnati Bearcats
He was head coach of the University of Cincinnati Bearcats' men's basketball team from 1978 to 1983, where he was a two-time Metro Conference coach of the year. On Dec. 21, 1981 Badger's team defeated Bradley 75–73 in a game that went into seven overtime periods.

Return to the NBA
Badger accepted an assistant coach job with the Cleveland Cavaliers in 1983. He then joined the Boston Celtics as an assistant coach and director of scouting under K.C. Jones in 1984, where he won an NBA championship with the 1985–1986 team, considered by many to be one of the greatest NBA teams of all time.

In 1988 Badger became vice president of basketball operations for the new expansion team Charlotte Hornets, where he stayed until 1990. He joined the Atlanta Hawks as director of scouting from 1990 to 1992. In 1992, he returned as an assistant coach for the Indiana Pacers, followed by assistant coach jobs with Miami Heat and Philadelphia 76ers and a chief scout job for the Minnesota Timberwolves before retiring in 2003.

Head coaching record

NBA

|-
| style="text-align:left;"|Chicago
| style="text-align:left;"|
| 82||44||38|||| style="text-align:center;"|3rd in Midwest||3||1||2|||| style="text-align:center;"|Lost in First Round
|-
| style="text-align:left;"|Chicago
| style="text-align:left;"|
| 82||40||42|||| style="text-align:center;"|3rd in Midwest||—||—||—||—
| align="center" |Missed Playoffs
|- class="sortbottom"
! align="center" colspan=2|Career
! 164||84||80|||| ||3||1||2||||

College

References

External links
 BasketballReference.com: Ed Badger

1932 births
Living people
American men's basketball coaches
Boston Celtics assistant coaches
Charlotte Hornets assistant coaches
Chicago Bulls assistant coaches
Chicago Bulls head coaches
Cincinnati Bearcats men's basketball coaches
College men's basketball head coaches in the United States
High school basketball coaches in Iowa
Iowa Hawkeyes men's basketball players
Junior college men's basketball coaches in the United States
Miami Heat assistant coaches
Wilbur Wright College faculty
American men's basketball players
People from West New York, New Jersey
Basketball coaches from New Jersey
Basketball players from New Jersey